Allium tel-avivense is a plant species found in Israel, Palestine, Jordan and Egypt, including the Sinai Peninsula. It is a bulb-forming perennial with a small umbel of only a few flowers. Tepals are pink, and the ovary is large, green and conspicuous.

References

tel-avivense
Onions
Flora of Egypt
Flora of Palestine (region)
Flora of Sinai
Plants described in 1931